Argyrodes argentatus is a kleptoparasitic spider.

In Singapore, it is often seen in webs of Nephila antipodiana.

On Guam it can often be found hanging in webs of the much larger spider Argiope appensa: while A. appensa can reach a total length of about 7 cm, A. argentatus females reach only 3mm, and males 2mm at the most.

Like in rats, following copulation the male seals the female's epigyne with a mating plug, preventing the female from further mating.

Distribution
It has been found in China, Japan, Guam, Thailand, Burma, Vietnam,  Sri Lanka, the East Indies (Singapore, New Guinea), and Hawaii.

Name
The species name argentatus means "silvery" in Latin.

References
 Pickard-Cambridge, O. (1880). On some new and little known spiders of the genus Argyrodes. Proc. zool. Soc. Lond. 1880:320-344.
 Kerr, A.M. (2005). Behavior of web-invading spiders Argyrodes argentatus (Theridiidae) in Argiope appensa (Araneidae) host webs in Guam. Journal of Arachnology 33(1): Abstract

External links
 Guide to common Singapore spiders: A. argentatus

Theridiidae
Spiders of Hawaii
Spiders of Asia
Spiders described in 1880